The Battle of Campo Santo was fought in Campo Santo, Italy on 8 February 1743 between Spain and Austria, as part of the War of the Austrian Succession. The Spaniards and their Neapolitan allies under General De Gages were fought to a standstill by the Austrians and their Sardinian allies under Field Marshal Traun on the Panaro. The Spanish sustained heavy casualties, but as darkness fell, Traun ordered a general retreat; de Gages, rather than pursue, himself drew back over the river.

Preliminary Maneuvering
In January 1743, General De Gages' Spanish army—13,000 strong—lay at Bologna, south of the Panaro. Count Traun's Austrian and Piedmont-Sardinian army—11,000 strong—lay to the north of the river, blocking De Gages' attempts to cross the formidable barrier. Traun preferred a maneuvering defense to risking his army in a pitched battle with his opponent, but concerns in Madrid were more political than strategic. Needing a victory, Philip V of Spain and his Queen Elizabeth Farnese demanded that De Gages launch an offensive or tender his resignation. Accordingly, leaving Bologna on the night of 3 February, De Gages slipped across the Panaro and entered the Duchy of Modena, seeking a decisive encounter with Traun.

Fortunately for De Gages, Marshal Traun was ready to oblige him. Aware of the criticism leveled at him in Vienna where his enemies were trying to relieve him of his command, and also that Spain's recent seizure of Savoy might well induce the King of Sardinia to negotiate with the Spanish Crown, the Marshal decided that a victory would quell the uproar and induce Austria's allies to think twice about negotiating. Gathering up his army, Traun moved to block De Gages' path and prevent him from advancing further into Modena. The two armies met at the village of Camposanto.

The battle
On the morning of the battle, De Gages drew up his army on the outskirts of the village in the traditional fashion with his infantry in the centre and the cavalry on the wings. Traun also drew up his army in the same way, but being slightly outnumbered, he chose to gamble with an un-orthodox strategy. Instead of aligning himself directly opposite the Spaniards, he shifted his troops to the northwest, which meant that the centre of Traun's infantry was directly opposite the gap between Gages' infantry and the right wing of cavalry. Although this meant that Traun would have a greater superiority of numbers on this wing and that he could also deliver a flank attack on the Spanish right, his own right flank would, however, be vulnerable to a Spanish flank attack. It seems that the Marshall was relying on the troops of that wing to delay the Spanish long enough for the action on his other wing to be decisive.

Matters were helped when De Gages chose 4:00 in the afternoon to launch the attack, which left very few hours of daylight for a battle. The Spanish were initially successful on both wings, where their cavalry drove off the Austro-Piedmontese cavalry, wounding Count Aspremont in the process and leaving the Austrian infantry vulnerable. However instead of reforming to attack the infantry, the Spanish chased them off the field. Traun stabilised his left flank, and led his infantry into the attack against the Spanish. Meanwhile, Count Schulenberg regrouped the Austrian cavalry on the Austrian right, and launched a counterattack against the Spanish cavalry. On the other flank, General Leutrum (Aspremont's replacement) led his wing forward as well, smashing the Spanish right wing. At this time due to the darkness for both of the armies it was necessary to withdraw the field; the Spanish back across the Panaro towards Bologna. Due to the smoke and the darkness, many units lost their way. The 1st Guadalaxara marched in the direction of the advancing austro-sardian infantry columns, and it had to surrender after a short defence inside the walls of a farm.

Casualties in the battle were 1,755 dead, 1,307 wounded and 824 prisoners for the Spanish, while the Austro-Piedmontese lost 397 dead and 1,153 wounded or prisoners. Traun himself had two horses shot from under him during the battle.

Aftermath
De Gages retreated to Bologna but on 26 March he was also forced to retreat to Rimini. Despite this, the battle was widely considered a victory in Madrid, and de Gages was awarded a victory title: Count of Campo Santo. Following the battle, France promised support and co-operation with the Spanish, but for the moment Traun had saved North Italy for Maria Theresa.

References

Further reading
Browning, R - The War of the Austrian Succession pg.131-133 Bibliography 403–431
Ilari, V - La Corona di Lombardia pp. 112–114.
Melendreras Gimeno, María del Carmen (1987). Las campañas de Italia durante los años 1743–1748. Editum. 

Campo Santo
1743 in Italy
Campo Santo
Campo Santo
Campo Santo
Campo Santo
1743 in Austria
Campo Santo
Campo Santo